SkyMarshall Arts is a Norwegian electronic dance music group established by Eirik Blodøks Hafskjold in 1995 in Sande, Vestfold. Though several other people are listed as members of the band, SkyMarshall Arts is technically a one-man show. His trademark has become melodic vocal remixes of classic game-music from the Amiga 500, Commodore 64 and Nintendo systems, claiming to make Music for the Gamer Generation. In addition he produces original work and collaborations with other indie artists. SkyMarshall Arts believes in free digital distribution, and his collected works can be found for unrestricted download free of charge at his official website at all times.

SkyMarshall Arts use Virtual Studio Technology and Trackers amidst guitars and vocals. The vocals often have a heavily harmonized chorus, or has been digitally altered by vocoders or similar to achieve a specific kind of artificial sound. He also commonly samples sound bites from movies, interviews and games to set the tone for his music. The lyrics are often humorous in nature and often reference specific characters or games from above mentioned systems.

Biography
SkyMarshall Arts started out in 1995 under the alias Dj Dark on the tracker-site Trax in Space publishing original and remixed music, producing music on the Amiga 500 in trackers like OctaMED. Influenced by the scene and sound of that time, the style has stuck with him and he continues to produce music in that genre still. The album Tracker in Training was the end result of this. When the community died out, he later advanced on to sequencers based on the Windows-platform utilizing tools such as Cubase, FLStudio, Adobe Audition and ReNoise. The next album The Nintendo Generation got available for download in 2007 under the new name SkyMarshall Arts.

The name SkyMarshall Arts is a pun and fusion of martial arts and Hafskjold's online nickname SkyMarshall, which again is a military-rank from the science-fiction movie Starship Troopers.

The third album Individual Evolution hit the net in 2010, featuring Forever Gamer, the biggest hit so far by SkyMarshall Arts. Over 70,000 listens on Newgrounds.com  (and 21.000 downloads on all songs combined) and 131,000 views on YouTube. This song created some well needed  publicity, and it created a solid fanbase for further continued underground releases. The next album ReLoad has been in production until 2012, featuring even more songs directed even more directly at the nostalgic gamer's online. In 2012, SkyMarshall Arts formed his own label, SkyMarshall Arts Studio. By forming a label, Skymarshall Arts was able to upload his music to and share his music via Spotify and iTunes. SkyMarshall Arts, however, could not upload every song. Because of this, he decided to abort ReLoad and create a new album, The Gamer Generation, containing songs from both ReLoad and Individual Evolution. In a YouTube comment, SkyMarshall Arts also revealed he is working on a new album, Memories in Sequence. The first song for this new album is called The Lost Patrol.

Members

 Eirik Hafskjold (SkyMarshall) – lead vocals, harmony vocals, programming, sequencing, lyrics and everything 1995–present.

Collaborating Musicians 

 Hania Lee (Hania) - female vocals.
 Roar Knudsen Winnem (R-Win) - male vocals, lyrics and rhythm guitar.
 Lars Erling Bolstad (Xenomorph) - arrangement, notably on the track "Forever Gamer".
 Tony Eriksen (Dancebangerz!) - remixer. SkyMarshall Arts - Back in the Day (Dancebangerz! Remix)
 Kai Raymond Vandli (Batista) - male vocals and electric guitar.
 Gjermund Bruun Olsen (Gjerminator) - male vocals.
 Kjell Andrè Mala (Vicious) - sound effects.

Discography

Digital albums 
Memories in Sequence (2012-unfinished)
 The Gamer Generation (2012)
 ReLoad (2010-2012) (unfinished)
Individual Evolution (2009)
The Nintendo Generation (2000)
Tracker in Training (1999)

Norwegian Albums
Støy på Landet (2010-unfinished)
Bygdetullinger (2008)

Videos
 Star Wars Anthology (11.05.2011)
 Farscape (04.04.2009)
 Back in Time (05.01.2009)
 Eclipse (Apoptygma Tribute (03.10.2008)
 Forever Gamer (feat. Xenomorph) (27.02.2008)
 Back in the Day (26.02.2008)
 Turrican (Original Cut) (26.02.2008)

References

External links
Official Website
Official Facebook Page
Official YouTube Page
SkyMarshall Arts' at Newgrounds.com
SkyMarshall Arts at Remix64.com

Chiptune musicians
Commodore 64 music
Norwegian Eurodance groups